Live in Stockholm is a live album by the band the Breeders. It was released exclusively by the Breeders fan club, Breeders Digest, and comprises eight tracks from a concert recorded in Stockholm, Sweden, in 1994.

Track listing

Personnel
Kim Deal - guitar, vocals
Kelley Deal - guitar, vocals
Josephine Wiggs - bass, vocals
Jim MacPherson - drums

References

The Breeders albums
1994 live albums
4AD live albums